Mi Vida Loca (Original Motion Picture Soundtrack) is the soundtrack to Allison Anders' 1994 film Mi Vida Loca. It was released on March 8, 1994, via Mercury Records and consisted of hip hop and contemporary R&B music, with Jellybean Benitez serving as the soundtrack's supervisor. The album reached number 70 on the Billboard Top R&B/Hip-Hop Albums chart.

Track listing
 "Tales from the Westside" – 3:45 (Proper Dos) 
 "The Good Hit" – 3:18 (Funkdoobiest)
 "If the Papes Come" – 4:14 (A Tribe Called Quest)
 "Run, Catch & Kill" – 4:58 (Boss)
 "Scandalous" – 3:34 (Psycho Realm)
 "Crooked is the Path" – 4:06 (Shootyz Groove)
 "Hey D.J." – 4:00 (A Lighter Shade of Brown) 
 "Weather 4 2" – 5:20 (Tony! Toni! Toné!)
 "Two Lovers" – 3:33 (A Lighter Shade of Brown)
 "Suavecito" – 4:39 (4-Corners)
 "Girls It Ain't Easy" – 4:02 (4-Corners)

Chart history

References

External links

1994 soundtrack albums
Mercury Records soundtracks
Hip hop soundtracks
Contemporary R&B soundtracks
Albums produced by DJ Muggs
Drama film soundtracks